Casper Frederik Crump (born 11 July 1977) is a Danish actor, best known for playing Enzo in Helium and Vandal Savage in the Arrowverse.

Since 2016, Crump has played the role of Vandal Savage in DC's Legends of Tomorrow. He appeared as Captain Kerchover in The Legend of Tarzan, which was released on 1 July 2016 by Warner Bros.

Filmography

References

External links 

Living people
1977 births
Danish male film actors
Place of birth missing (living people)
Danish male television actors
21st-century Danish male actors
Male actors from Copenhagen